John Griffiths (15 September 1909 – 1975) was an English footballer who played at left-back for Wolverhampton Wanderers, Bolton Wanderers, and Manchester United in the 1930s. He won promotion out of the Second Division three times, once with Wolves and twice with Manchester United.

Career

Wolverhampton Wanderers
Griffiths joined Wolverhampton Wanderers from Shirebrook in May 1929, making his debut on 26 April 1930 in a 4–4 draw with Bradford Park Avenue. This turned out to be one of just six appearances for the club though. Wolves finished ninth in the Second Division in 1929–30, before finishing fourth in 1930–31 and winning the division in 1931–32.

Bolton Wanderers
He left Molineux, and moved to Bolton Wanderers in 1932, but did not make much of an impact as he had several injuries. The "Trotters" suffered relegation out of the First Division in 1932–33, and narrowly missed out on promotion back to the top-flight in 1933–34.

Manchester United
Griffiths left Burnden Park for Manchester United in March 1934, becoming a replacement for Jack Silcock who left the club in August 1934. The "Red Devils" finished fifth in the Second Division in 1934–35, before going up as champions in 1935–36. He scored his only senior goal on 1 April 1936, in a 2–2 draw with Fulham at Craven Cottage. United were relegated straight out of the First Division in 1936–37, before winning promotion once again in 1937–38 with a second-place finish. United finished 14th in the top-flight in 1938–39. His professional footballing career was ended due to the Second World War, but he still played 58 games for the club during the war. He also guested for Notts County, Stoke City (16 appearances), Port Vale, West Bromwich Albion, Derby County.

Hyde United
After the war he became a player-coach of Cheshire County League side Hyde United. He played 22 league and two FA Cup games for Hyde. He also played in the 1946 Cheshire Senior Cup final victory over Witton Albion at Gresty Road on 30 March 1946. He later worked as a physiotherapist in Gee Cross, which was then in Cheshire.

Career statistics
Source:

Honours
Wolverhampton Wanderers
Football League Second Division: 1931–32

Manchester United
Football League Second Division: 1935–36
Football League Second Division second-place promotion: 1937–38

Hyde United
Cheshire Senior Cup: 1946

References

 

1909 births
1975 deaths
People from Fenton, Staffordshire
Footballers from Stoke-on-Trent
English footballers
Association football fullbacks
Shirebrook Miners Welfare F.C. players
Wolverhampton Wanderers F.C. players
Bolton Wanderers F.C. players
Manchester United F.C. players
Notts County F.C. wartime guest players
Stoke City F.C. wartime guest players
Port Vale F.C. wartime guest players
West Bromwich Albion F.C. wartime guest players
Derby County F.C. wartime guest players
Hyde United F.C. players
English Football League players
Association football coaches
British physiotherapists